Hannah Casey (born 20 September 1988) is an Irish rugby union player. She was a member of the Irish squad at the 2014 Women's Rugby World Cup. Also starting player for the invitational Barbarians She made her international debut in 's opening match against  at the 2014 Six Nations Championship.

References

External links
Saracens Player Profile

1988 births
Living people
Irish female rugby union players
Ireland women's international rugby union players
Irish Exiles women's rugby union players